Berland Anthony (born 1923) was an Indian professional footballer who played as a goalkeeper for East Bengal and India in both the 1951 Asian Games and 1952 Summer Olympics.

International
Anthony was part of the India side that participated and won gold during the 1951 Asian Games held in India. He was also part of the India squad that participated in the 1952 Summer Olympics in Helsinki. He started in India's only match that tournament against Yugoslavia on 15 July 1952. India were knocked-out as they lost 10–1.

Honours
India
Asian Games Gold medal: 1951

References

External links 
 

1923 births
Year of death missing
Indian footballers
Footballers from Maharashtra
East Bengal Club players
Association football goalkeepers
Olympic footballers of India
Footballers at the 1951 Asian Games
Footballers at the 1952 Summer Olympics
India international footballers
Medalists at the 1951 Asian Games
Asian Games gold medalists for India
Asian Games medalists in football
Calcutta Football League players